Narsingarh is a census town in West Tripura district in the Indian state of Tripura.

Demographics
 India census, Narsingarh had a population of 6819. Males constitute 55% of the population and females 45%. Narsingarh has an average literacy rate of 71%, higher than the national average of 59.5%: male literacy is 78%, and female literacy is 62%. In Narsingarh, 10% of the population is under 6 years of age.

References

Cities and towns in West Tripura district
West Tripura district